Clayhanger is a village in the Metropolitan Borough of Walsall in the West Midlands, England. The village is situated between Pelsall, Walsall Wood and Brownhills. The village has only one road running through it from Pelsall/Brownhills to Walsall Wood. The village has no other through roads and is predominantly residential.

History
Clayhanger was first mentioned by the Earl of Stafford in 1391, it was a scattered hamlet until the time of the industrial revolution when the coal mines and railways arrived in the area and as a result. Clayhanger grew in both population and size.

Amenities
The village is served by a Co-op store and also has local amenities such as a butchers, a fish and chips shop and a Chinese takeaway.

Education
The village has a Church of England primary school called "Holy Trinity Church of England primary school". The nearest high schools are in Brownhills, Walsall, Bloxwich and Aldridge.

Churches

The village has two churches:

Clayhanger Methodist Church - on Clayhanger Lane and is an active part of the wider Brownhills and Willenhall Methodist Circuit.
Clayhanger Holy Trinity Worship Centre - on Church Street and is next to the primary school of the same name.

Transport

Clayhanger is served by bus number 8 between Walsall and Lichfield via Rushall, Pelsall, Brownhills and Burntwood. This runs through the centre of the village. The village was also served by the former South Staffordshire Line and Aldridge to Brownhills Branch line. The village was served by three railway stations at Brownhills, Walsall Wood and Pelsall. The village is also served by the Daw End Branch Canal which forms the border between itself and Walsall Wood/Brownhills as well as Clayhanger Common.

Recreation
Clayhanger Common on the outskirts of the village is a large woodland park and woodland trust.

References

Walsall